Gephyromantis eiselti, commonly known as Eiselt's Madagascar frog, is a species of frog in the family Mantellidae.  It is endemic to Madagascar.  Its natural habitats are subtropical or tropical moist lowland forests, subtropical or tropical moist montane forests, and heavily degraded former forest.

References

eiselti
Endemic fauna of Madagascar
Taxa named by Jean Marius René Guibé
Taxonomy articles created by Polbot
Amphibians described in 1975